Anti-nuclear organizations may oppose uranium mining, nuclear power, and/or nuclear weapons. Anti-nuclear groups have undertaken public protests and acts of civil disobedience which have included occupations of nuclear plant sites. Some of the most influential groups in the anti-nuclear movement have had members who were elite scientists, including several Nobel Laureates and many nuclear physicists.

Types of organizations
Various types of organizations have identified themselves with the anti-nuclear movement:

 direct action groups, such as the Clamshell Alliance and Shad Alliance;
 environmental groups, such as Friends of the Earth and Greenpeace;
 consumer protection groups, such as Ralph Nader's Critical Mass;
 professional organizations, such as International Physicians for the Prevention of Nuclear War; and
 political parties such as European Free Alliance.

Some of the most influential groups in the anti-nuclear movement have had members who were elite scientists, including several Nobel Laureates and many nuclear physicists. In the United States, these scientists have belonged primarily to three groups: the Union of Concerned Scientists, the Federation of American Scientists, and the Committee for Nuclear Responsibility.

Activities
Anti-nuclear groups have undertaken public protests and acts of civil disobedience which have included occupations of nuclear plant sites. Other salient strategies have included lobbying, petitioning government authorities, influencing public policy through referendum campaigns and involvement in elections. Anti-nuclear groups have also tried to influence policy implementation through litigation and by participating in licensing proceedings.

International organizations
 The ATOM Project, international nonprofit organization seeking entry into force of the Nuclear Nonproliferation Treaty and the limitation of all nuclear arsenals.
 European Nuclear Disarmament, held annual conventions in the 1980s involving thousands of anti-nuclear weapons activists mostly from Western Europe but also from Eastern Europe, the United States, and Australia.
 Friends of the Earth International, a network of environmental organizations in 77 countries.
 Global Zero, international non-partisan group of 300 world leaders dedicated to achieving the elimination of nuclear weapons.
 Global Initiative to Combat Nuclear Terrorism, international partnership of 83 nations.
 Greenpeace International, non-governmental environmental organization with offices in over 41 countries and headquarters in Amsterdam, Netherlands. 
 International Campaign to Abolish Nuclear Weapons
 International Network of Engineers and Scientists for Global Responsibility
 International Physicians for the Prevention of Nuclear War, had affiliates in 41 nations in 1985, representing 135,000 physicians; IPPNW was awarded the UNESCO Peace Education Prize in 1984 and the Nobel Peace Prize in 1985.
 Nuclear Free World Policy
 Nuclear Information and Resource Service 
 OPANAL
 Parliamentarians for Nuclear Non-Proliferation and Disarmament, global network of over 700 parliamentarians from more than 75 countries working to prevent nuclear proliferation.
 Pax Christi International, Catholic group which took a "sharply anti-nuclear stand". 
 Ploughshares Fund
 Pugwash Conferences on Science and World Affairs
 Socialist International, world body of social democratic parties.
 Sōka Gakkai, a peace-orientated Buddhist organisation, which held anti-nuclear exhibitions in Japanese cities during the late 1970s, and gathered 10 million signatures on petitions calling for the abolition of nuclear weapons. 
 The Ribbon International, United Nations Non-Governmental Organization promoting nuclear disarmament.
 United Nations Office for Disarmament Affairs
 World Disarmament Campaign
 World Information Service on Energy, based in Amsterdam, The Netherlands
 World Union for Protection of Life
 World Wide Fund for Nature (WWF), calls for a complete phase-out of nuclear energy.

List of other organizations
Many of these groups are listed at "Protest movements against nuclear energy" in Wolfgang Rudig (1990). Anti-nuclear Movements: A World Survey of Opposition to Nuclear Energy, Longman, pp. 381–403.

Alliance for Nuclear Accountability
Alliance for Nuclear Responsibility
Arms Control Association
Australian Conservation Foundation
Bellona Foundation 
Campaign Against Nuclear Energy
Campaign for Nuclear Disarmament
Campaign for Nuclear Disarmament (NZ)
Canadian Coalition for Nuclear Responsibility 
Canadian Voice of Women for Peace
Christian CND
Citizens' Nuclear Information Center
Clamshell Alliance
Coalition for Nuclear Power Postponement
Committee for Non-Violent Action
Committee for a Nuclear Free Island
Committee for Nuclear Responsibility
Council for a Livable World
Critical Mass
Cumbrians Opposed to a Radioactive Environment
Don't Make a Wave Committee
Earthlife Africa
East Coast Solidarity for Anti-Nuke Group
Economists for Peace and Security
Energy Fair
Energy Probe
European Nuclear Disarmament 
Friends of the Earth (EWNI)
Friends of the Earth Scotland
Global Security Institute
Greenpeace Aotearoa New Zealand
Greenpeace Australia Pacific
Institute for Energy and Environmental Research
International Campaign to Abolish Nuclear Weapons
International Physicians for the Prevention of Nuclear War
Koeberg Alert
Labour CND
Legambiente
MEDACT
Musicians United for Safe Energy
Natural Resources Defense Council
Nevada Desert Experience
Nevada Semipalatinsk
New England Coalition
No Nukes group
No to Nuclear Weapons
One Less Nuclear Power Plant
Nuclear Age Peace Foundation
Nuclear Consulting Group
Nuclear Control Institute
Nuclear Disarmament Party
Nuclear Free World Policy
Nuclear Threat Initiative
NukeWatch
Operation Gandhi
Peace Action
Peace Boat
Peace Organisation of Australia
Pembina Institute
People's Movement Against Nuclear Energy
Performers and Artists for Nuclear Disarmament
Physicians for Social Responsibility
Plowshares Movement
Public Citizen Energy Program
Rocky Flats Truth Force
Sayonara Nuclear Power Plants 
Scientists against Nuclear Arms
Scottish Campaign for Nuclear Disarmament
Seeds of hope
Shad Alliance
Sierra Club
Sortir du nucléaire (Canada)
Sortir du nucléaire (France)
Stop Rokkasho
The Seneca Women's Encampment for a Future of Peace and Justice
The Wilderness Society (Australia)
Top Level Group
Trident Ploughshares
Two Futures Project
White House Peace Vigil
Women from Fukushima Against Nukes 
Women Strike for Peace 
Women's Action for New Directions (WAND) previously called Women's Action for Nuclear Disarmament, forerunner organization: Women's Party for Survival
Women's International League for Peace and Freedom
World Nuclear Industry Status Report

See also 

Anti-nuclear groups in the United States
List of anti-nuclear power groups
Anti-nuclear protests in the United States
List of books about nuclear issues
List of companies in the nuclear sector
List of nuclear power groups
List of Nuclear-Free Future Award recipients
List of renewable energy organizations
List of anti-war organizations
List of peace activists
Non-nuclear future
 Nuclear organizations (Wikipedia category)

References

 
Lists of organizations